Boot-licking can mean:
 Sycophancy
 In the context of BDSM, boot worship